Aloha Paradise is an American comedy series that aired on ABC on Wednesday night from February 25, 1981, to April 22, 1981. The series stars Debbie Reynolds and was created by Tom Greene.

Aloha Paradise was executive produced by Douglas S. Cramer and Aaron Spelling, the same team that produced The Love Boat to which the series bore a resemblance.

Plot
The series follows the lives of the staff and guests at The Paradise Village resort, located on the coast of Kona, Hawaii. Debbie Reynolds portrayed Sydney Chase, Paradise Village's manager. Bill Daily portrayed the resort's assistant manager Curtis Shea. Other staff members included Fran (Pat Klous), the resort's social director, Mokihama as bartender Evelyn Pahinui, and Stephen Shortridge as lifeguard Richard Bean. Each episode tells three or four stories about people either in love, out of love, or looking for love.

Cast
 Debbie Reynolds as Sydney Chase
 Bill Daily as Curtis Shea
 Pat Klous as Fran Linhart
 Mokihama as Evelyn Pahinui
 Stephen Shortridge as Richard Bean
 Charles Fleischer as Everett

Guest stars
Aloha Paradise featured many weekly guest stars including:

 Ralph Bellamy
 Ken Berry 
 Ray Bolger
 James Broderick
 Red Buttons
 Ruth Buzzi
 Nanette Fabray
 Joan Fontaine
 Grant Goodeve
 Lorne Greene
 Rosey Grier
 Lisa Hartman
 Van Johnson
 Dean Jones
 Louis Jourdan
 Audrey Landers
 Michael Lembeck
 Randolph Mantooth
 Jayne Meadows
 Pat Morita
 Don Most
 Jim Nabors
 Harriet Nelson
 Denise Nicholas
 Leslie Nielsen
 Louis Nye
 Joanna Pettet
 Gene Rayburn
 Dick Sargent
 Larry Storch
 Connie Stevens
 Jessica Walter
 Jonathan Winters
 Dana Wynter

Episodes

Production notes
Aloha Paradise was produced by Aaron Spelling Productions. The series' two-hour pilot episode was shot on location on the Kona Coast in Hawaii. The remaining episodes were shot on a replica beach at Universal Studios in Los Angeles.

Reception and cancellation
Aloha Paradise was largely panned by critics who compared it to the more successful and long-running comedy series The Love Boat. Scheduled on Wednesdays opposite NBC's popular sitcoms Diff'rent Strokes and The Facts of Life, ratings for the series were low. As a result, ABC decided to cancel the series after eight episodes. Series star Debbie Reynolds later said Aloha Paradise had "...the worst scripts ever. That's why it failed. They didn't even advertise that I was in it. I totally disliked every script and they didn't like me interfering."

References

External links
 

1981 American television series debuts
1981 American television series endings
1980s American comedy television series
American Broadcasting Company original programming
English-language television shows
Television series by Spelling Television
Television shows set in Hawaii